This partial list of city nicknames in Mississippi compiles the aliases, sobriquets and slogans that cities in Mississippi are known by (or have been known by historically), officially and unofficially, to municipal governments, local people, outsiders or their tourism boards or chambers of commerce. City nicknames can help in establishing a civic identity, helping outsiders recognize a community or attracting people to a community because of its nickname; promote civic pride; and build community unity. Nicknames and slogans that successfully create a new community "ideology or myth" are also believed to have economic value. Their economic value is difficult to measure, but there are anecdotal reports of cities that have achieved substantial economic benefits by "branding" themselves by adopting new slogans.

Some unofficial nicknames are positive, while others are derisive. The unofficial nicknames listed here have been in use for a long time or have gained wide currency.
 Artesia – Johnson Grass Capital of the World
Belzoni – Catfish Capital of the World.
Biloxi – The Playground of the South
Columbus – Possum Town
Greenwood – Cotton Capital of the World.
Gulfport
 Root Beer Capital of the World.
 Where Your Ship Comes In
Hattiesburg – Hub City
Jackson
Chimneyville Lynch, Adam. "Chump Change for Chimneyville" , Jackson Free Press, April 4, 2007, accessed April 22, 2007
City with Soul.
Long Beach – Radish Capital of the World
Meridian – The Queen City
 Oxford
The literary center of the South
The Little Easy (in reference to New Orleans, the "Big Easy")
The Velvet Ditch 
Port Gibson – The town too beautiful to burn
Senatobia – The Five Star City
Starkville – Starkvegas
Vicksburg
The Gibraltar of America.
Red Carpet City of the South
Take Me to the River

See also
 List of city nicknames in the United States

References

Mississippi cities and towns
Populated places in Mississippi
City nicknames